Epimetasia monotona is a moth in the family Crambidae. It was described by Hans Georg Amsel in 1953. It is found in Mauritania.

References

Moths described in 1953
Odontiini